Juan de San Millán (1497 – 11 April 1578) was a Roman Catholic prelate who served as Bishop of León (1564–1578) and Bishop of Tui (1547–1564).

Biography
Juan de San Millán was born in Barrionuevo, Spain.
On June 1547, he was appointed during the papacy of Pope Paul III as Bishop of Tui.  On 28 Jul 1564, he was appointed during the papacy of Pope Pius IV as Bishop of León. 
He served as Bishop of León until his death on 11 April 1578.

References

External links and additional sources
 (for Chronology of Bishops) 
 (for Chronology of Bishops) 
 (for Chronology of Bishops) 
 (for Chronology of Bishops) 

16th-century Roman Catholic bishops in Spain
1497 births
1578 deaths
Bishops appointed by Pope Paul III
Bishops appointed by Pope Pius IV